Étampes is a railway station in Étampes, Essonne, Paris, France. The station was opened in 1843 and is on the Paris–Bordeaux railway and Étampes–Beaune-la-Rolande railway. The station is served by Paris' express suburban rail system, the RER. The train services are operated by SNCF.

Train services
The station is served by regional trains (TER Centre-Val de Loire) to Orléans and Paris, and by local RER trains to Paris and its suburbs.

See also 
 List of stations of the Paris RER

References

External links

 

Railway stations in Essonne
TER Centre-Val de Loire
Réseau Express Régional stations
Railway stations in France opened in 1843